In UK politics, the Gang of Four was a breakaway group of four Labour politicians who founded the Social Democratic Party in 1981, including two sitting Labour MPs and a former deputy leader of the party.

The term Gang of Four is a reference to the political faction of four Chinese Communist Party officials who came to prominence during the Cultural Revolution (1966–1976) and were accused of attempting to seize power following the death of Mao Zedong.

History 
Bill Rodgers, Shirley Williams, Roy Jenkins and David Owen proposed a group called the Council for Social Democracy which ended up becoming the Social Democratic Party. Their first public move was the Limehouse Declaration, named after the house in Limehouse where David Owen lived and where the group met.

The Gang of Four were followed by a score of other Labour MPs.

The Gang of Four

Views and legacy 
In March 2017, the three then-living members of the SDP Gang of Four all said Jeremy Corbyn should step down as leader before the next general election originally scheduled for 2020 under the Fixed-term Parliaments Act. In the 2017 general election, Labour under Corbyn again finished as the second-largest party in parliament, but the party increased their share of the popular vote to 40%, resulting in a net gain of 30 seats and a hung parliament.

In 2019, The Independent Group were described as similar to the Gang of Four, which was backed by Bill Rodgers.

References 

Social Democratic Party (UK)
British political phrases
British political party founders